Walford Halt railway station is a disused halt on the Ross and Monmouth Railway constructed near the Herefordshire village of Walford. It also served the surrounding settlements. Nothing remains of the station.  It was located approximately 3 miles and 12 chains along the railway from Ross-on-Wye station.

History
It was opened by the Great Western Railway on 23 February 1931 and consisted of 120 ft platform and a small hut on the east side of the line. It was unstaffed and had no freight facilities or sidings.
The staff of Kerne Bridge station lit the platform lights and cleaned the stop, though its traffic receipts were counted with Ross-on-Wye's.

The halt closed on 5 January 1959 when the Ross and Monmouth Railway was closed to passengers. The track was still used from Ross-on-Wye to Lydbrook until 1965 as a private siding to serve a cable works.

References

Further reading

External links
 Station on 1952 OS Map

Railway stations in Great Britain opened in 1931
Railway stations in Great Britain closed in 1959
Former Great Western Railway stations
Disused railway stations in Herefordshire
History of Herefordshire